Julia Cavanough (born 17 March 2004) is an Australian cricketer who currently plays for Tasmania in the Women's National Cricket League (WNCL) and Hobart Hurricanes in the Women's Big Bash League (WBBL). She plays as a left-arm medium bowler.

Domestic career
In May 2022, Cavanough received her first contract, signing with Tasmania for the upcoming WNCL season. In October 2022, Cavanough was also signed by Hobart Hurricanes for the upcoming WBBL season, although she did not play a match for the side that year. In December 2022, she played for Tasmania in the Cricket Australia Under-19 National Female Championships, and was the side's leading run-scorer, including two half-centuries. On 18 December 2022, Cavanough made her debut for Tasmania's senior team, taking 1/33 from her 7 overs in her side's 10 wicket victory over New South Wales. She went on to play ten matches for the side that season, taking six wickets at an average of 39.50.

References

External links

Julia Cavanough at Cricket Australia

Living people
2004 births
Place of birth missing (living people)
Australian women cricketers
Tasmanian Tigers (women's cricket) cricketers
Hobart Hurricanes (WBBL) cricketers